Gennady Vasilyevich Novitsky (tr. Gennadiy Vasilyevich Novitskiy; born January 2, 1949) is a Belarusian politician, born in Mogilev.

He was a Deputy Prime Minister from 1997 to 2001. He has held various positions including the position as the 5th Prime Minister of Republic of Belarus. Novitsky served in his Prime Ministerial office under the Presidency of Alexander Lukashenko. He held this position from October 2001 until Sergey Sidorsky's appointment in July 2003. 

More recently, Navicki held the post of speaker of Council of the Republic of Belarus.

See also

 Politics of Belarus

References

1949 births
Living people
People from Mogilev
Prime Ministers of Belarus
Speakers of the Council of the Republic of Belarus
Belarusian civil engineers